The India national cricket team toured the Pakistan during the 1989–90 cricket season. India  played four Test matches and four One Day International matches between November 15 and December 22, 1989, against the Pakistan cricket team, with the Test series drawn 0–0 and Pakistan winning the ODI series 2–0. The series marked the international debut of Sachin Tendulkar.

Test matches

1st Test

2nd Test

3rd Test

4th Test

One Day Internationals (ODIs)

Pakistan won the Wills Challenge 2-0, with one no result and one match abandoned.

1st ODI

2nd ODI

3rd ODI

4th ODI

References

External links
 Cricarchive
 Tour page CricInfo
 Record CricInfo

1989 in Indian cricket
1989 in Pakistani cricket
1989-90
Pakistani cricket seasons from 1970–71 to 1999–2000
International cricket competitions from 1988–89 to 1991